Mohamed Abdelkadir Bettamer (born 1 April 1993) is a professional footballer who plays as a centre forward for Concord Rangers on loan from Hayes & Yeading United.

Born in England, he represents Libya at international level.

Early and personal life
Bettamer was born in Camden, to a Libyan father and a Moroccan mother.

Club career
Bettamer began his career in the youth team at London Tigers, where he made his senior debut. In 2010 he joined Watford on a one-year scholarship but was not offered a professional contract. He then returned to London Tigers before joining Hayes & Yeading United, making his debut in November 2011. Bettamer was unable to hold down a first team spot with the Conference Premier side and joined Bedfont Town on loan before being released in March 2012. He then spent the remainder of the season with North Greenford United. He played with Hampton & Richmond Borough in 2012–13, before trials at Dagenham & Redbridge, and Maidenhead United. He then joined Al-Ahly (Benghazi) in Libya on a three-year contract, with whom he reached the quarter-finals of the CAF Champions League. Due to the civil war in Libya, leading to the suspension of the domestic league in the country, he was unable to play during the final two years of his contract. After it expired, he then joined Staines Town, with whom he scored 42 goals in 89 games. He signed a pre-contract agreement with Stevenage in the summer of 2018, but with no contract on the table he joined Braintree Town on a non-contract basis, before a move to Salford City fell through.

Barnet
Bettamer signed for Barnet on 9 November 2018. Two days later Bettamer made his debut on 11 November 2018 in the FA Cup against League One club Bristol Rovers which finished 1–1 and required a replay. His National League debut for Barnet came in the away game against Hartlepool United helping the team to a 3–1 win. Subsequently Bettamer was then loaned out to Welling United and Hemel Hempstead Town.

Aldershot Town
He signed for Aldershot Town on a free transfer from Barnet in October 2019. He joined Maidstone United on a one month loan in January 2022. On 26 February 2022, the loan was extended for a further month. Bettamer was released by the club at the end of the 2021–22 season.

Hayes & Yeading return
In July 2022, Bettamer returned to Hayes & Yeading United. In November 2022, he joined Concord Rangers on loan, a deal that was later extended until the end of the season.

International career
He has represented Libya at under-18, under-20 and under-23 youth levels. He was called-up by the senior team in November 2020. He debuted for the senior Libya national team in a 3–2 2021 Africa Cup of Nations qualification loss to Equatorial Guinea on 11 November 2020, scoring his team's second goal in his debut.

At the 2018 CONIFA World Football Cup, he represented the Barawa football team, scoring twice in five games. As he was added to the team after the tournament started, and as he was not of Somali descent, his inclusion caused a controversy which resulted in the Ellan Vannin football team, who had protested, to be disqualified from the tournament.

Playing style
Primarily a  centre forward, Bettamer can also play as a left winger.

Career statistics

Club

International

International goals
Scores and results list Libya's goal tally first.

References

1993 births
Living people
English footballers
Libyan footballers
London Tigers F.C. players
Watford F.C. players
Hayes & Yeading United F.C. players
Bedfont Town F.C. players
North Greenford United F.C. players
Hampton & Richmond Borough F.C. players
Al-Ahly SC (Benghazi) players
Staines Town F.C. players
Braintree Town F.C. players
Barnet F.C. players
Welling United F.C. players
Hemel Hempstead Town F.C. players
Aldershot Town F.C. players
Maidstone United F.C. players
Concord Rangers F.C. players
Association football forwards
Libya youth international footballers
Libya international footballers
English people of Libyan descent
English people of Moroccan descent
Libyan people of Moroccan descent
Footballers from Greater London
National League (English football) players
Isthmian League players
Southern Football League players
Libyan Premier League players